Thomas Rawlinson Sale  (1 April 1865 – 25 October 1939) was Archdeacon of Rochdale from 1919 to 1935.

Sale was educated at Marlborough and New College, Oxford and ordained in 1890. After a curacy in Rochdale he was Domestic Chaplain to the Bishop of Manchester.  In 1897 he married Katharine Sophia Bradshaw: they had sons and two daughters. He held incumbencies at Leesfield, Crumpsall, Huddersfield and Blackburn before his appointment as Archdeacon.

References

1865 births
People educated at Marlborough College
Alumni of New College, Oxford
Archdeacons of Rochdale
1939 deaths